Costoanachis geovanysi is a species of sea snail, a marine gastropod mollusk in the family Columbellidae, the dove snails.

Description

Distribution
Costoanachis geovanysi can be found in Cuba.

References

External links

Columbellidae
Gastropods described in 2014